Lyuben Doychev (born 26 October 1911, date of death unknown) was a Bulgarian athlete. He competed in the men's decathlon at the 1936 Summer Olympics.

References

1911 births
Year of death missing
Athletes (track and field) at the 1936 Summer Olympics
Bulgarian decathletes
Olympic athletes of Bulgaria
Place of birth missing